Bigwala is a genre of ceremonial music and dance of the Busoga Kingdom in Uganda centered around gourd trumpets.

Typically a solo trumpet is joined by four or more other trumpets, which produce a melody through playing in hocket, these are then joined by singers and then by dancers, both of which circle the instrumentalists while swaying.

Originally performed during royal celebrations such as coronations and funerals, and more recently during social occasions, but less frequently: "At present...there are only four remaining older master bearers with skills in Bigwala making, playing and dancing, and their recent transmission attempts have been frustrated by financial obstacles."

The genre contributes to Busoga unity and identity, with lyrics primarily narrating the history of the Kingdom, focusing on the King himself (a symbol of Busoga identity), as well as addressing other social issues. Godfrey Alibatya, who helped promote Bigwala to the UNESCO list, argues that, "the apparent extinction of Bigwala might contribute to the weakening of the kingship," and kingdom. David Pier argues that Alibatya is helping preserve the genre despite its obscurity, unlike most items on the list, which are cherished by the local community.

References

External links
Musinguzi, Bamuturaki (2013). "Gourd trumpets face threats of extinction", TheEastAfrican.co.ke.
Vision Reporter (2013). "Bigwala: Busoga's royal music, dance", NewVision.co.ug.

Dance in Uganda
Ugandan music
Intangible Cultural Heritage in Need of Urgent Safeguarding